In the Whirlwind of Revolution is a 1922 Soviet silent drama film directed by Aleksandr Chargonin. The film is about a miners' strike in Tsarist Russia. Against the background of the events develops a romance between the head of the workers and a girl from a wealthy family.

The film's art direction was by Vladimir Ballyuzek.

Cast
 Zoya Barantsevich 
 N. Vishnyak

References

Bibliography 
 Derek Spring & Richard Taylor. Stalinism and Soviet Cinema. Routledge, 2013.

External links 
 

1922 films
Soviet silent feature films
1920s Russian-language films
Soviet black-and-white films
Soviet drama films
1922 drama films
Silent drama films